The Malaysia national under-20 futsal team for under 20 level represents Malaysia in international futsal competitions and is controlled by the Futsal Commission of the Football Association of Malaysia.

under-20